Ferdinand Fellner (15 March 1815 - 25 September 1871) was an Austrian architect. He was born and died in Vienna.

Life

Works

Bibliography
 https://de.wikisource.org/wiki/BLK%C3%96:Fellner,_Ferdinand
 
 Felix Czeike: Historisches Lexikon Wien Bd. 2. Kremayr & Scheriau: Wien 1993

Architects from Vienna
1815 births
1871 deaths